"No More Rain (In This Cloud)" is the debut single by American recording artist Angie Stone. It was written by Stone along with Bert Williams and Gordon Chambers for Stone's debut studio album, Black Diamond (1999), while production was helmed by Stone. The song is built around a sample of "Neither One of Us (Wants to Be the First to Say Goodbye)" by Gladys Knight & the Pips. Due to the inclusion of the sample, Jim Weatherly is also credited as a songwriter. The song served as Stone's solo debut single and reached the top of Billboards Adult R&B Songs in the United States.

Track listings

Notes
 denotes additional producer

Charts

Weekly charts

Year-end charts

References

External links
 

1999 songs
1999 debut singles
Songs written by Gordon Chambers
Arista Records singles
Angie Stone songs
Songs written by Angie Stone
Songs written by Jim Weatherly
1990s ballads